"Three Lions" is the English football anthem of 1996. It may also refer to:

The Royal Arms of England, a coat of arms symbolising England (originally England, Normandy and the Duchy of Aquitaine—historically all ruled by Richard I)
The Three Lions, a nickname of the England national football team
Three Lions (video game), an interactive video game around the game of football
The Three Lions, a 2013 play by William Gaminara
The Three Lions crest of the England cricket team
The Coat of arms of Dalmatia
The Coat of arms of Denmark, originally the coat of arms of the House of Estridsen which ruled Denmark between 1047 and 1412. 
The Coat of arms of Estonia, derived from the coat of arms of Denmark.

See also 
 Four Lions, a 2010 British black comedy film
 Three Hearts and Three Lions, 1961 fantasy novel